Manilla is a small town in New South Wales, Australia, located on Fossickers Way 45 kilometres northwest of the regional city of Tamworth and 27 kilometres northeast of the historic village Somerton. Manilla is famous for its setting as a fishing and paragliding area. The name Manilla comes from the Gamilaraay language, and is said to mean 'winding river'.

Manilla was established in the 1850s at the junction of the Namoi River and the Manilla River. It was formerly the centre of Manilla Shire local government area, but this was amalgamated with Tamworth City Council and portions of Parry, Barraba and Nundle Shire Councils to form Tamworth Regional Council in 2004.  It lies next to the Bundarra-Barraba Important Bird Area which is important for the conservation of the critically endangered regent honeyeater.  Manilla is also well known for Split Rock Dam on the Manilla River and Lake Keepit on the Namoi River.

Services
Bowling Club
Caravan Park
Royal Hotel 
Ambleside B&B Ambleside
Motel
Police Station
Post Office
Swimming Pool
Sportsground
Tennis Courts
War Memorial Hall, Library and Pre-School
Fuel Station & Cafe North Store – Manilla

History
The junction of the Manilla and Namoi Rivers was for generations, a camping ground for the local indigenous people, members of the large Kamilaroi (Gamilaraay) tribes of northwestern New South Wales. During the 1850s, teamsters with bullock waggons were regularly transporting goods from the Hunter District through the Manilla area to outlying cattle stations and the northern goldfield settlements of Bingara and Bundarra. Teams were often delayed at the junction of the Namoi and Manilla Rivers by high water. In 1853, enterprising Englishman George Veness arrived at ‘The Junction’ to set up a store and wine shop at the teamsters’ camping ground. In doing so, Veness led the way to town settlement and is acknowledged as the Founder of Manilla. The town's early prosperity was founded on the highly productive wheat and pastoral industries.

Manilla also features a new library centre. Located within the Tamworth Regional Council office in the main street of Manilla, the library is a new type of facility which is known globally as a convergence centre. This means there are many facilities on offer including Centrelink Agency, the Manilla Book Club, a free weekly Storytime for preschool aged children and many other community activities.

Australian singer-songwriter Darren Hanlon immortalised the town of Manilla in his song 'Manilla NSW' which appeared on his 2006 record, 'Fingertips and Mountaintops'.

At the 2006 census, Manilla had a population of 2,081, while in the  there were 2,550 people.

Rugby League and Dally Messenger
In July 1917 Dally Messenger and his wife, Annie, took over the Royal Hotel in Manilla. Shortly after his arrival Dally established the Manilla Rugby League Club. This was difficult as there was a strong Rugby Union Team and many other young men were at Gallipoli or other theatres of the First World War. 

His original team included Jack Hiscox, Roy Blanch, Frank and Norman Chapman, Jack Munro and Ivan Miller. Dally played some games but was more concerned, as coach, into forming these local young men into a quality team. In 1918 in the knockout competition held in Tamworth, Manilla defeated Quirindi 10-6 and Tamworth 14 nil. 

In June 1919 Both Dally and Annie caught the Spanish flu pandemic. Dally recovered but tragically Annie died on 23 June 1919 and is buried in the Manilla cemetery. On 23 August 1919 Dally returned to Sydney with his five year old son (Dally II).

Marking the history on the very day of its formation, 8 July 2017, the Manilla Rugby League club under captain Coach Mitch Doring celebrated its 100th anniversary (2017) of formation with a hard fought match against the Bendemeer Mountain Men whom they defeated 34-30. Guests of honour at the celebratory dinner afterwards included Dally Messenger’s grandsons Ken and Dally Messenger, and great grandchildren Cameron Dally Messenger and Genevieve Ann Messenger.

Heritage listings 
Manilla has a number of heritage-listed sites, including:
 Tamworth-Barraba railway: Manilla railway underbridges

Aviation sports
In recent years, Manilla has become famous throughout the world as a major sports flying centre supporting hang gliding, paragliding, ultralight aircraft, gyrocopters and gliders (sailplanes). It boasts nearby Mt Borah, one of the world's best paraglider and hang glider launch sites. Major free-flight competitions are staged annually during the summer months. The 10th FAI Paragliding World Championships were held at the site in 2007, attended by 150 pilots from 41 nations. The dramatic story was made into a TV documentary Miracle in the Storm which won an AFI award and was nominated for a Logie Award.

Notable residents

Henry Burrell (1873–1945), an amateur naturalist, photographer & film-maker, began unlocking the secrets of the platypus.
Stan Coster (27 May 1930 – 25 March 1997), an Australian country music singer-songwriter.
Tracy Coster, Australian country music artist, daughter of Stan Coster (above)
Fiona Coote, aged 14, in 1994 became Australia's second and also its youngest heart transplant recipient.
Anna Henderson, an ABC News journalist.
Gavin Coote, an ABC News journalist
Dally Messenger (1883–1959), a rugby league and rugby union player. He came to Manilla in 1917 and held the licence of The Royal Hotel.
 Rod Coote, an Australian indie-pop music singer-songwriter
Harry M. Miller, entrepreneur, bought the Manilla property "Dunmore" in the 1970s.
John Quayle, Australian former rugby league CEO, began playing rugby league with Manilla as a boy.
Anne Rouen, an historical fiction author.
Godfrey Wenness ASM (1967), paragliding pilot and instructor, developed the Mt Borah airsports facility and school in 1994. Guinness Book of World Records for the longest flight in a paraglider in 1998 (335 km). Australian Sports Medal (2000).

Notes and references

External links

More History – Manilla Museum Website

Towns in New South Wales
Towns in New England (New South Wales)
North West Slopes
Tamworth Regional Council